Castle Sowerby is a civil parish in the Eden District of Cumbria, England. In 2001 it had a population of 337, increasing to 344 at the 2011 Census, and includes the hamlets of How Hill, Millhouse, Newlands, Sour Nook, Southernby and Sowerby Row.

The 12th century and later St Kentigern's Church is Grade II* listed.

Castle Sowerby was one of the manors which formed part of the Honour of Penrith which has been owned at various times by the Neville Earls of Westmorland, the English Crown, the Earls and Dukes of Portland and the Dukes of Devonshire.

It was the birthplace of Reverend William Sowerby, a notable Anglican clergyman who served in Australia.

See also

Listed buildings in Castle Sowerby

References

External links
 Cumbria County History Trust: Castle Sowerby (nb: provisional research only – see Talk page)

Civil parishes in Cumbria